The Lakeside ATCC round was an Australian Touring Car Championship motor racing event held at Lakeside International Raceway in Brisbane, Queensland, Australia. The event was held 29 times from 1964 to 1998, with only seven circuits having hosted more events in championship history as of 2021.

History
The Lakeside round of the championship was first held in the era of single-race championships, deciding the Australian Touring Car Championship in 1964 and 1967 for two of Ian Geoghegan's five championship wins. The circuit held two further events as part of a multi-round championship in 1970 and 1971, the second of which was a replacement event for the Warwick Farm Raceway event due to concerns over the circuit's safety barriers. The circuit did not return to the calendar until 1975, but then remained on the calendar for an uninterrupted spell which continued until 1998.

The circuit hosted championship deciders in 1975, 1981 and 1983. The 1981 decider was notable for a famous race-long duel between local driver Dick Johnson's ailing Ford XD Falcon and Peter Brock's Holden VC Commodore. Johnson prevailed and won the first of his five championships in what is considered one of the greatest races in championship history. The 1983 finale was a more controversial affair, in which Gibson Motorsport boycotted the final round, resulting in championship contender George Fury forfeiting any chance of taking his maiden title. Instead, Allan Moffat won his final championship title and the only title for Mazda. Fury went on to win the Lakeside event in 1984, Nissan's first championship round victory, and 1986.

Tony Longhurst won three of his five career rounds at Lakeside in the late 1980s and early 1990s. This comprised winning the only round not won by Dick Johnson Racing in 1988, winning one of the two championship events the circuit held within the 1991 season and winning the final ATCC round to date for BMW in 1992. The circuit's proximity to Lake Kurwongbah saw two events postponed due to flooding, the 1989 event by a fortnight and the 1996 event by one week. In 1994, Larry Perkins, already a four-time Bathurst 1000 winner, won his first championship round.

In 1999, Queensland Raceway, near Ipswich, replaced Lakeside on the championship calendar. Lakeside then appeared on the second-tier V8 Lites calendar in 2000 and 2001, before the circuit closed for eight years in 2001.

Winners

Notes
  – Lakeside hosted two rounds of the 1991 Australian Touring Car Championship, Round 4 and Round 8.

Multiple winners

By driver

By team

By manufacturer

Event names and sponsors
1964, 1967, 1970–71, 1975–77, 1979–85, 1987–98: Lakeside
1978: Round 7 Presented by Rothmans
1986: Motorcraft 100

See also
 List of Australian Touring Car Championship races

References

Supercars Championship races
Motorsport in Queensland
Sport in Brisbane
Kurwongbah, Queensland